Ted Swinford is an American rower. He won a gold medal at the 1986 World Rowing Championships in Nottingham with the men's coxless four. He was inducted in the National Rowing Hall of Fame (Stoningham, CT) in January 1997.

References

Year of birth missing (living people)
American male rowers
World Rowing Championships medalists for the United States
Living people